The T.R. Kelly House is a historic house within the Springville Historic District in Springville, Utah, United States, that is individually listed on the National Register of Historic Places (NRHP).

Description
The house is located at 164 West 200 South and was built in 1903. According to architectural historian Deborah R. Temme, writing the NRHP nomination:
The Kelly House, because on the one hand it reflects the popular trend of the time, the use of books for house designs, and on the
other hand, because it is a unique type among the types that were built and repeated, reflects the owner's desire to be up to date according to the method of design, but also expresses his concurrent wish to have a house that would
stand apart from others and express his own individuality.

It was listed on the NRHP December 9, 1993.

See also

 National Register of Historic Places in Utah County, Utah

References

External links

Gothic Revival architecture in Utah
Houses completed in 1903
Houses in Utah County, Utah
Houses on the National Register of Historic Places in Utah
National Register of Historic Places in Utah County, Utah
Buildings and structures in Springville, Utah
Individually listed contributing properties to historic districts on the National Register in Utah